Cycling at the 2013 Southeast Asian Games took place at Mount Pleasant in Naypyidaw for BMX, mountain biking, roads of 3 towns (Leway, Pyinmanar, Tatkon) for road and Wunna Theikdi Cycling Field in Naypyidaw for Track between December 11–19.

Medal table

Medalists

Road cycling

Men

Women

Mountain biking

BMX

Results

Road cycling

Men's 50 km individual time trial
December 15

Men's 100 km team time trial
December 16

Men's 163 km road race
December 18

In the table below, "s.t." indicates that the rider crossed the finish line in the same group as the cyclist before him, and was therefore credited with the same finishing time.

Men's 163 km team road race
December 18

Women's 30 km individual time trial
December 15

Women's 128 km road race
December 17

In the table below, "s.t." indicates that the rider crossed the finish line in the same group as the cyclist before her, and was therefore credited with the same finishing time.

Mountain biking

Men's down hill

Timed Run
December 13

Final
December 14

Men's cross-country
December 13
Legend
 DNFn Did Not Finish (abandoned in lap n)
 -n Lap Lapped with n laps remaining

Women's down hill

Timed Run
December 13

Final
December 14

Women's cross-country
December 13
Legend
 DNFn Did Not Finish (abandoned in lap n)
 -n Lap Lapped with n laps remaining

Mixed cross-country relay
December 12

BMX

Men
December 19

Seeding run

Qualifying

Heat 1

Heat 2

Final

Women

Seeding run

Final

References

2013 Southeast Asian Games events
2013
Southeast Asian Games
2013 in road cycling
2013 in mountain biking
2013 in BMX